Pure Electric Honey is the debut studio album by Ant-Bee, released in 1990 by VOXX Records.

Release
Originally, the album was made available only on vinyl. In 2005, it was remastered and released on CD for the first time accompanied by the 1988 Through the Window Pain demo. Pure Electric Honey, along with Ant-Bee's other works, is currently issued under and can be purchased through Barking Moondog Records' online store.

Track listing

Personnel
Adapted from Pure Electric Honey liner notes.

 Billy James (as The Ant-Bee) – vocals, drums, percussion, tablas, guitar, keyboards, tape, production, illustration
Musicians
 Timmy Cannon (as Ymmit) – bagpipes
 Charlotte (as Fuzzy Martin) – backwards violin
 Bob & Thana Harris (as Rantin' & Ravin') – rantin' & ravin'
 Roy Herman (as Herman Monster) – electric guitar, acoustic guitar, slide guitar, beast guitars
 Scott Kolden (as Nedlok Tocs) – guitar, production, engineering

Musicians (cont.)
 Greg Lamastro (as Mr. Green Beans) – sitar
 Jeff Marden (as Om Shanti) – flute
 Rod Martin (as Mod Martin) – slide guitar
 Todd Rogers (as The Spiral Staircase) – keyboards
 Rick Snyder (as Purple Plastic Penguin) – bass guitar
 Jeff Wolfe (as The Colonel) – harmonica
 Gouda & the Potato: meows

Release history

References

External links 
 Pure Electric Honey at Discogs (list of releases)
 Ant-Bee on Barking Moon Records

1990 debut albums
Ant-Bee albums